Mesothen caeruleicorpus is a moth of the subfamily Arctiinae. It was described by Schaus in 1905. It is found in Bolivia, Colombia, Ecuador, and Peru.

References

 Natural History Museum Lepidoptera generic names catalog

Mesothen (moth)
Moths described in 1905